This is a list of hospitals in the U.S. state of Washington, sorted by city and hospital name.

The first hospital in the modern-day state of Washington was established at Fort Vancouver in 1858, serving fur traders and local indigenous people.

Hospitals

Psychiatric Facilities

Former hospitals

References

External links
 Washington State Hospital Association: Member Listing
 Washington Hospitals

Washington

Hospitals